Alex Cardillo (born January 15, 1997) is an Irish-Canadian former actor. He played Mark Verrity, Penelope Verrity's (Michelle Forbes) son in the second season of the TV drama Durham County and Frost in the Canadian action film I Declare War.

Personal life
Cardillo was born in Dublin, Ireland but was raised in Kenya, East Africa to an Irish mother and British father. He currently resides in Ottawa, Ontario, Canada.

Filmography

References

External links

1997 births
Living people
Canadian male child actors
Canadian male television actors
Male actors from Dublin (city)
Male actors from Ottawa
Irish emigrants to Canada
21st-century Canadian male actors